Cobeta is a municipality located in the province of Guadalajara, Castile-La Mancha, Spain. According to the 2004 census (INE), the municipality has a population of 108 inhabitants.

Its origins can be traced back to the Christian repopulation of the area, belonging from its beginning to the dominion of the Lara family; in 1153 Don Manrique and his wife Doña Ermesenda donated Cobeta to the cathedral chapter of Sigüenza.

References 

Municipalities in the Province of Guadalajara